This list of 2018 NFL draft early entrants consists of college football players who forfeited remaining collegiate eligibility and were declared by the National Football League (NFL) as eligible to be selected in the 2018 NFL draft. This includes juniors and redshirt sophomores who completed high school at least three years prior to the draft. A player that meets these requirements can renounce his remaining NCAA eligibility and enter the draft. Players had until January 16, 2018, to declare their intention to forgo their remaining collegiate eligibility.

Terminology

List of players
The following players had 2018 draft eligibility granted, or confirmed, by the NFL.

Players granted early eligibility

 Courtel Jenkins transferred to Houston in 2017, but did not play for them.

Players who have successfully completed their college degrees and are draft eligible

Players who can enter the draft without the need for special eligibility

References

2018 NFL draft early entrants
2018 National Football League season